Oskarshamns AIK is a Swedish football club located in Oskarshamn in Kalmar County.

Background
Oskarshamns Allmänna Idrottsklubb were formed on 1 September 1922. Notable players that have played for the club include Amar Drndo, Viktor Niklasson and Kawaar Betkari.

Since their foundation Oskarshamns AIK has participated mainly in the middle divisions of the Swedish football league system.  The club currently plays in Division 1 Södra Götaland which is the fourth tier of Swedish football. They play their home matches on artificial turf at the Arena Oskarshamn in Oskarshamn. The club also uses Ernemar IP.

Oskarshamns AIK are affiliated to Smålands Fotbollförbund.

Current squad

Recent history
In recent seasons Oskarshamns AIK have competed in the following divisions:

2020 – Division I, Södra
2019 – Division I, Södra
2018 – Division I, Södra
2017 – Division I, Södra
2016 – Division I, Södra
2015 – Division I, Södra
2014 – Division I, Södra
2013 – Division II, Södra Götaland
2012 – Division II, Östra Götaland
2011 – Division III, Sydöstra Götaland
2010 – Division III, Nordöstra Götaland
2009 – Division III, Sydöstra Götaland
2008 – Division III, Sydöstra Götaland
2007 – Division IV, Småland Östra Elit
2007 – Division IV, Småland Elit Södra
2006 – Division III, Sydöstra Götaland
2005 – Division II, Mellersta Götaland
2004 – Division II, Östra Götaland
2003 – Division III, Sydöstra Götaland
2002 – Division IV, Småland Östra Elit
2000 – Division IV, Småland Sydöstra
1999 – Division III, Nordöstra Götaland
1998 – Division III, Nordöstra Götaland
1997 – Division III, Nordöstra Götaland

Attendances

In recent seasons Oskarshamns AIK have had the following average attendances:

Footnotes

External links
 Oskarshamns AIK – Official website
 Oskarshamns AIK on Facebook

Sport in Kalmar County
Football clubs in Kalmar County
Association football clubs established in 1924
1924 establishments in Sweden